Futaba may refer to:

People
 , a Japanese singer
 , Japanese manga artist
 , Japanese professional rock climber
 , Japanese educator 
 , Japanese women's footballer

Fictional characters
 Futaba, Aasu, anime character
 Hotaru Futaba, a video game character
 Samurai Futaba, a character played by John Belushi in Saturday Night Live Samurai
 Futaba Yoshioka, the protagonist from the anime and manga series Ao Haru Ride
 Futaba Sakura, a character from the video game Persona 5
 Futaba Sana, a character from the game Magia Record
 Rio Futaba, a character in the anime Rascal Does Not Dream of Bunny Girl Senpai
 Futaba Naruse, a character from romance ecchi manga, Tsuiteru Kanojo and it sequels Idakasetekudasai Futaba-san 
 Futaba Hanaya, a character from the Chinese/Japanese anime series To Be Herorine
 Tsukushi Futaba, a character from the anime franchise BanG! Dream
 Futaba Isurugi, a character in the Revue Starlight franchise

Places
 Futaba, Fukushima, a town in Futaba District, Fukushima, Japan
 Futaba, Yamanashi, a town in Kitakoma District, Yamanashi, Japan

Other
 Futaba Channel, a Japanese imageboard (commonly known as 2chan)
 Futaba Corporation, a manufacturer of radio control devices
 Futaba Town, Twinleaf Town in localization, a fictional town in the Pokémon universe

See also
 Futaba-Kun Change!, a manga series by Hiroshi Aro

Japanese feminine given names
Japanese-language surnames